Denys Petrovych Molchanov (born 16 May 1987) is a Ukrainian tennis player playing on the ATP Challenger Tour winning 15 singles and 62 doubles titles. He has also won one ATP doubles title. On 5 January 2015 he reached his highest ATP singles ranking of World No. 169, whilst his highest doubles ranking of No. 63 was reached on 22 July 2019. He also played for the Ukraine Davis Cup team.

Career

2018
Molchanov reached his first ATP doubles final at the 2018 Swiss Open in Gstaad partnering Igor Zelenay.

2022
At the 2022 Melbourne Summer Set 1 he reached the semifinals partnering Ricardas Berankis losing to sixth seeds Aleksandr Nedovyesov and Aisam-Ul-Haq Qureshi.

At the 2022 Open 13 Molchanov won his first title partnering Andrey Rublev in Marseilles.

Personal life
In February 2015, he faced never confirmed or investigated allegations of match-fixing after suspicious betting patterns and unforced errors were noticed during a defeat to Agustín Velotti.

ATP career finals

Doubles: 2 (1 title, 1 runner-up)

Challenger and Futures finals

Singles: 26 (15–11)

Doubles: 99 (63–36)

References

External links
 
 
 

1987 births
Living people
Sportspeople from Chișinău
Ukrainian male tennis players
Tennis players at the 2016 Summer Olympics
Olympic tennis players of Ukraine
21st-century Ukrainian people